Siddy is an upcoming Indian Malayalam-language thriller film, directed by Pious Raj for producer Maheswaran Nandagopal. The film stars Aji John and former International footballer I M Vijayan in lead roles. The debut directorial is heavily inspired by Fyodor Dostoevsky' s Crime and Punishment.

Principal photography started in August 2021 and the film will also be dubbed into Tamil.

Summary 
Siddy is the journey through the life and mind of a law student who turns into a murderer.

Cast 
Aji John
I. M. Vijayan
Rajesh Sharma			
Akshaya Udayakumar		
Haritha Haridas
Venu Nariyapuram
Harikrishnan
Madhu Vibhakar
Divya Gopinath
Thanuja Karthik
Swapna Pillai

Production
Pious Raj, an advertisement films director, inspired by Fyodor Dostoevsky' s Crime and Punishment, launched himself as director as Maheswaran Nandagopal bankrolled the project. Former International footballer and actor I M Vijayan was signed for an important role along with Aji John, an actor as well as director who has helmed Hotel California. Composer Ramesh Narayan who does only selective films was signed for the film with Karthik S.Nair, an associate of Ravi Varman as cinematographer. The film began the shooting at the time of second phase lockdown at the locations of Ernakulam, Vizhinjam harbour and  Kovalam. Ramesh Narayan said that he signed the film, as the director wanted him to use Hindustani music as a different genre.

References

External links
 

Indian thriller films
Upcoming directorial debut films
Upcoming films
Upcoming Malayalam-language films
Films shot in Kochi
Films shot in Thiruvananthapuram